The Queen of the Turf Stakes, raced as The Coolmore Legacy Stakes, is an Australian Turf Club Group 1 Weight for age horse race for fillies and mares aged three years old and upwards, over a distance of 1600 metres at Royal Randwick Racecourse, Sydney in the autumn during the ATC Championships series. It is run on the same day as the Sydney Cup.
Total prizemoney is A$1,000,000.

History
The race was previously held at Rosehill Racecourse but in 2014 the event was moved to be part of the ATC Championships series at Royal Randwick Racecourse.

Distance
1972 - 1 mile (~1600m)
1972–2007 - 1500 metres
2008 - 1550 metres 
2009–2013  - 1500 metres 
2014 onwards  - 1600 metres

Grade

1972–1978 - Principal race
1979–1984 - Listed race
1985–1990 - Group 3
1991–2004 - Group 2
2005 onwards - Group 1

Venue
 1972–2007 - Rosehill Racecourse
 2008 - Canterbury Park Racecourse 
 2009–2013 - Rosehill Racecourse
 2014 onwards - Randwick Racecourse

Name
1972–2015 - Queen Of The Turf Stakes
2016 onwards - The Coolmore Legacy Stakes

Winners

2022 - Nimalee
2021 - Nettoyer
2020 - Con Te Partiro
2019 - Kenedna
2018 - Alizee
2017 - Foxplay
2016 - Azkadellia
2015 - Amanpour
2014 - Diamond Drille
2013 - Appearance
2012 - More Joyous
2011 - More Joyous
2010 - Typhoon Tracy
2009 - Neroli
2008 - Forensics
2007 - Divine Madonna
2006 - Mnemosyne
2005 - Ike's Dream
2004 - In A Bound
2003 - Hosannah
2002 - Ugachaka
2001 - Sorrento
2000 - Danglissa
1999 - Camino Rose
1998 - Arletty
1997 - Kenbelle
1996 - Shame
1995 - Light Up The World
1994 - The Perfume Garden
1993 - Excited Angel
1992 - Romanee Conti
1991 - Ricochet Rosie
1990 - Memphis Blues
1989 - Special Finish
1988 - Chez Paree
1987 - Shinakima
1986 - Harbor Flo
1985 - Casual  
1984 - Tempestuous
1983 - More Rain
1982 - C'est Si Bon
1981 - Ducatoon
1980 - Scomeld
1979 - Never Despair
1978 - Lady Archon
1977 - Piemelon Bay
1976 - Visit
1975 - Just Topic
1974 - Favoured
1973 - Millefleurs
1972 - Refulgence

See also
 List of Australian Group races
 Group races

External links 
Queen Of The Turf Stakes (ATC)

References

Group 1 stakes races in Australia
Sprint category horse races for fillies and mares